The 1965 Argentine Primera División was the 74th season of top-flight football in Argentina. The season began on April 18 and ended on December 19.

There were 18 teams in the tournament, who competed in a single double round-robin tournament. Boca Juniors won its 16th league title with no teams relegated.

Standings

References

Argentine Primera División seasons
Argentine Primera Division
1